Portola High School (PHS) is one of five public high schools in the Irvine Unified School District (IUSD) and is located in Irvine, California. The groundbreaking ceremony was held in October 2014 and the school opened in August 2016. The school is located at the intersection of the Rise Park, Altair, and Solis Park neighborhoods in the eastern part of the city.

Student body
The school opened in August 2016 with 400 ninth-grade students. In each successive year, a new grade level was added, ninth and tenth grade students attending in 2017–2018, grades 9–11 in 2018–2019, and grades 9–12 starting in the 2019–2020 school year.

Campus
Portola's campus is located on land formerly occupied by the Irvine Ranch and Marine Corps Air Station El Toro. It was constructed to meet criteria established by the Collaborative for High Performance Schools.

Volatile organic compounds were detected in soil gas samples in 2014, but on May 19, 2016, the Portola High School site was declared safe by the California Department of Toxic Substance Control.

Physical features 
PHS contains specialized buildings outside of normal classrooms. These features come in part from IUSD's Educational Specifications.

Innovation Lab 
The Innovation Lab is run through the staff in the library (aka. the Student Commons) and contains multiple methods and machines to produce products using multiple formats such as plastic, metal, wood, etc.

Layout  
The school is laid out in groups of buildings:

 VAPA Arts
 Theater
 Stadium and associated buildings
 Science Building
 Math Building
 English and foreign language classes
 Administration and food services
Classroom building groups are linked on the second story by walkways.

Many spaces have multiple uses; the cost savings allowed for construction of the theater, stadium, and aquatics center in the first phase rather than in a later expansion.

The middle of each floor in the building contains a student collaboration area with multiple arrangements of seating, a projector, whiteboards, and whiteboard tables. This space can be used both for quiet work and for collaboration between classes.

Student Union and lunch areas 
The Student Union is an indoor area used for lunch and small events. Outside, tables form a "quad" where students can eat and converse. However, students are free to roam throughout the campus to eat.

Learning Commons 
The Learning Commons functions as the school library, containing databases that students can use for research as well as multimedia resources including two TVs, and also providing study space. It is separated from the Student Union by a retractable glass wall; they can be combined to provide space for events.

Theatre 
The 720-seat theater holds an advanced audio-visual setup with wireless audio, manual and automatic lighting, orchestra pit, and a full stage. The seating areas are split between two floors. The building, along with a normal theater with stadium seating, contains a black box theatre for specialized uses.

Schedule 
Under normal circumstances, the school uses an eight-period, alternating block schedule with one day in which students meet in all courses for a short period of time. On Mondays, students attend all courses but with shorter periods. It’s known as "Anchor Day" in the course schedule. From Tuesday to Friday, students attend 3–4 longer classes per day, depending how many they’re taking during a given semester. This number can be as low as 2 for seniors on specific days.

During the COVID-19 pandemic, the school utilized a hybrid schedule for the 2020–2021 school year. From Tuesday to Friday, students were divided into two cohorts. Each day, one cohort met onsite for in-person instruction while the other met via online video conferencing software.

Academics 
Portola offers academic programs spanning Social Science, English, Visual and Performing Arts (VAPA), Science, and more with College Prep, Honors, and Advanced Placement programs. Students are not able to take most Advanced Placement (AP) courses until Junior year (unless the student is on an advanced pathway for math or chooses to take AP Human Geography as a Sophomore). There are currently 22 AP courses offered at Portola. Additionally, there are numerous Regional Occupational Programs (ROP) offered in which students can take courses specializing in medicine, medical careers, video production, computer graphics, and engineering.

Athletics
Portola High School's athletic teams, known as the Bulldogs, compete in the California Interscholastic Federation/Southern Section. Portola participates in the following sports: baseball, basketball, cross country, American football, golf, lacrosse, pep squad, soccer, softball, swimming/diving, tennis, track and field, volleyball, water polo, and wrestling. Portola competes in the Pacific Coast League in all sports, except for American football in which they compete in the Pacific Hills conference of Pacific Coast League.

Student life

House system 
Lacking a traditional inter-class competitiveness, the Portola staff established a house system. There are four houses, which compete for points: Orion, Poseidon, Hercules, and Pegasus. The Associated Student Body of Portola is charged with creating and hosting competitions and events which give students the opportunity to earn house points. During the 2020–2021 school year, Portola decided to get rid of the house system and establish traditional grade level competitions in which students were split into Freshmen, Sophomores, Juniors, and Seniors.

PNN 
Portola News Network (PNN) is a biweekly broadcast that informs students about school and community events and entertains an audience of over 2000 people with various student features and other stories.

Portola Pilot 
The Portola Pilot is the school's newspaper. It publishes its papers monthly and is distributed to students for free during the advisement period. The Portola Pilot is a nationally and locally awarded and recognized paper and Portola High School's official student journalism program. Articles are uploaded every school day at the Pilot website, portolapilot.com.

Technology 
The 1:1 Chromebook Program provides each student at the school with a free Chromebook. This system allows teachers and students to incorporate new teaching and learning elements in the classroom with equal accessibility to all students. At the beginning of the 2020–2021 school year, Portola launched a Chromebook insurance policy in which parents and students have the option to purchase US$20 insurance from IUSD to cover accidental damage and theft. The goal was to "ease concerns about damage to devices and continue to support a sustainable take-home program for our schools". However, the insurance does not cover Chromebook chargers.

Awards 
Best of the Best K-12 Education Award – California – January 30, 2018

Best of the Best K-12 Education Award – National – January 30, 2018

References

External links
 School Website
 Builder Service Announcement

Public high schools in California
High schools in Orange County, California
Education in Irvine, California
Buildings and structures in Irvine, California
2016 establishments in California